Nadia Catherine Schadlow (born c. 1965) is an American academic and defense-related government officer who briefly served in 2018 as Assistant to the President and Deputy National Security Advisor for Strategy in the Trump Administration. She is the primary author of the 2017 National Security Strategy (NSS).

Early life, education and family
Schadlow grew up in Bedford Hills, New York. She holds a B.A. degree in government and Soviet studies from Cornell University and M.A. and Ph.D. degrees from the Paul H. Nitze School of Advanced International Studies (SAIS) at Johns Hopkins University. She has three children.

Early government career
Schadlow started as a civil servant at the Department of Defense focusing on the Soviet Union and the newly independent Ukraine within the Office of the Secretary of Defense. Later, she served on the Defense Policy Board from September 2006 to June 2009.

Academic career
Schadlow is a full member of the Council on Foreign Relations. Her articles have appeared in Parameters, The American Interest, the Wall Street Journal, The Atlantic, and Philanthropy, and she has written chapters for several edited volumes. She is author of the book, War and the Art of Governance: Consolidating Combat Success Into Political Victory, which looks at cases in which militaries are involved in non-military governance activities.

National Security Council
Schadlow was appointed to the National Security Council staff by long-time colleague H.R. McMaster in March 2017. Upon her appointment, journalist Thomas E. Ricks described both her and Fiona Hill, who joined the NSC at the same time, as "well-educated, skeptical, and informed..." During this time, Schadlow became the primary author of the 2017 National Security Strategy (NSS). Her work on the document and the inter-agency process that preceded it were well received by foreign policy experts across the political spectrum. About a year later, Schadlow would comment that the NSS had "achieved the state of mattering".

Schadlow was chosen to replace Dina Powell as deputy national security advisor in January 2018, although her tenure was brief. After John R. Bolton replaced McMaster as National Security Advisor on April 9, 2018, it was announced that Schadlow would resign effective April 27. Her departure was seen as part of a larger "cleaning house" that Bolton undertook upon appointment.

Post-NSC career
Following her resignation from the NSC, she joined the Hudson Institute as a Senior Fellow and became a Fellow at Schmidt Futures. Schadlow is also an Advisory Board Member of Spirit of America.

References

External links

 Biography page at Army War College
 December 2018 interview with CBS News

Living people
American women civil servants
Cornell University alumni
Johns Hopkins University alumni
United States Department of Defense officials
Trump administration personnel
United States National Security Council staffers
People from Katonah, New York
Sacred Heart University faculty
Hudson Institute
Year of birth missing (living people)
United States Deputy National Security Advisors
21st-century American women